The Renault R31 was a Formula One racing car designed by Lotus Renault GP for the 2011 Formula One season. The chassis was designed by James Allison, Naoki Tokunaga, Tim Densham and Dirk de Beer with Rob White leading the engine design. The car was driven by Vitaly Petrov and Nick Heidfeld, who was replaced mid-season by Bruno Senna.

Design

The R31 was unveiled at the Circuit Ricardo Tormo in Valencia, Spain on 31 January 2011, where Vitaly Petrov was first to drive it. Renault had planned to have Robert Kubica as teammate to Petrov, but Kubica got injured when participated in a rally. So, Renault hired Kubica's former BMW Sauber teammate Nick Heidfeld instead. The car attracted attention for a radical exhaust system, with speculation suggesting that it could be routed under the floor to create a "forward blown diffuser" effect after the car was unveiled with no visible exhaust vents, though Renault did not confirm nor deny any technical developments except to state that the car had been the product of a twelve-month development cycle. It was suggested that several other teams were quick to adapt to the concept, with talk that the forward blown diffuser would be implemented on several cars for upcoming tests. It had been further implied that the exhaust system offered significant gains, as incorporating them is a complex process, requiring teams to rearrange the internal electronics of the car and undertaking strenuous side-impact tests to get the new parts approved. However, some key personnel from other teams – most notably Mercedes' Ross Brawn – downplayed the importance of the parts.
The exhaust system became a major disadvantage as the season unfolded. The car suffered from low downforce on slower circuits, particularly Singapore. The system also made it extremely difficult to develop the car. After the Abu Dhabi Grand Prix, designer James Allison admitted the forward exhaust concept rendered the R31 a 'failed experiment':

Martin Brundle described the forward-facing exhaust as "sounding like a bag of nails." However David Coulthard disproved this theory by buying a bag of nails.

Controversy 
The car's distinctive black and gold livery was designed as a tribute to the Team Lotus cars of the 1980s and the famous John Player Special liveries (those cars also used Renault engines). Speculation suggested that as the design is reminiscent of a cigarette package, the team would be in violation of strict anti-tobacco laws in Canada and would be unable to use it at the 2011 Canadian Grand Prix. However, senior team personnel dismissed the claims, stating that "another famous team" was racing with colours similar to those of another tobacco brand and had done so in Canada without trouble in previous years. Ultimately, the car raced in Canada with no changes to its livery.

Season review
This was followed by an equal qualifying and race result for Nick Heidfeld in the  while teammate Petrov was launched in the air by a high kerb with a few laps remaining. In Malaysia, the Renault drivers wore golden overalls. This was to be the last of Renault's podiums though, and they remained fourth in the Constructors' Championship after Petrov's ninth in China and their first double points score in Turkey with seventh and eighth. The R31 was repaired by Sunday though, and Heidfeld charged to the points (eighth) and pushed teammate Petrov out of them (eleventh) in the process.

In Monaco Petrov crashed out from sixth place with 6 laps to go, knocking himself unconscious temporarily, and causing a red flag. Heidfeld still collected valuable points though, finishing in eighth again. In a wet , it was Heidfeld's turn to crash, this time from fourth; Petrov however, still took fifth by the end of the race. Heidfeld took points in both Valencia and Britain to keep them ahead of Mercedes for as long as possible, before they ended up fifth after the Silverstone race. Two retirements for Heidfeld followed in his final two races for the team in Germany and Hungary, both causing significant damage to the R31. With only a ninth in Germany for Petrov, at the team's first no score of the season in Hungary it was obvious development of the R31 was not fast enough and they were slipping backwards. 
 
After the summer break, the car seemed to have rediscovered form in qualifying; with Heidfeld's replacement Bruno Senna qualifying seventh in mixed weather in Spa and Petrov tenth - and the pair the opposite way around in Monza. Unfortunately, the same could not be said for these races, with only two ninth places (and Senna's first points) from the pair of them. Senna did not improve his position in the race, and Petrov moved up one place. This meant the team were struggling even to maintain their fifth place in the Constructors' Championship - sixth placed Force India had scored 36 points in the last four Grands Prix to Renault's 4, and were now only 22 points behind. Three disappointing races followed in Korea, India and Abu Dhabi, where neither driver scored a point. Senna failed to score points by finishing in seventeenth, yet Renault remained fifth in the Constructors' Championship standings with a best result of third place, albeit being 95 points behind Mercedes.

Complete Formula One results
(key) (results in bold indicate pole position; results in italics indicate fastest lap)

 Driver failed to finish the race, but was classified as they had completed >90% of the race distance.

References

External links

R31